Rustic may refer to:
Rural area
Pastoral

Architecture
 Rustication (architecture), a masonry technique mainly employed in Renaissance architecture
 Rustic architecture, an informal architectural style in the United States and Canada with several variations

Zoology
 Rustic moths, various noctuid moths of subfamilies Hadeninae and Noctuinae, including
 The rustic, (Hoplodrina blanda, Hadeninae)
 The rustic (Cupha erymanthis), a brush-footed butterfly
 Rustic sphinx (Manduca rustica), a hawkmoth

Other uses
 Rustic, Toronto, a neighbourhood in Toronto, Ontario, Canada
 Rustic capitals, a formal Roman script